Sulphur High School can refer to:

 Sulphur High School (Louisiana), in Sulphur, Louisiana
 Sulphur High School (Oklahoma), in Sulphur, Oklahoma